Panjin–Yingkou high-speed railway is a high-speed rail line operated by China Railway High-speed in central Liaoning province, connecting the coastal cities of Panjin and Yingkou, with a total length of  and start construction on May 31, 2009. Total cost of this project is 127.86 million RMB. The line opened on September 12, 2013.

The line linked the existing Qinhuangdao–Shenyang passenger railway and Harbin–Dalian high-speed railway, shortening journeys between the Liaodong Peninsula and the south by avoiding Shenyang. It has one intermediate station, Panjin railway station.

High-speed railway lines in China
Rail transport in Liaoning
3
Railway lines opened in 2013